Bonanza: The Return is a 1993 American Western  made-for-television film. It is a sequel to both the 1959–1973 television series Bonanza and the 1988 made-for-television film Bonanza: The Next Generation. The film was directed by Jerry Jameson and featured noted character actors Ben Johnson, Jack Elam, Dean Stockwell, Linda Gray, and Richard Roundtree.

Production
None of the characters from the original series appears since the entire cast, with the exception of Pernell Roberts and David Canary, were dead. Michael Landon Jr. and Dirk Blocker, sons of the original series' stars, do appear, although Blocker, who looked and sounded almost exactly like his father, was cast in a different, smaller role but his face and voice were featured prominently in the commercials advertising the film. Bonanza: The Return was followed two years later with the TV-movie Bonanza: Under Attack. David Canary, who portrayed Candy Canaday on the original series, was not involved with either TV-movie.

Plot
The setting is The Ponderosa in the year 1905. Augustus Brandenburg (Dean Stockwell), a land baron, attempts to take the Ponderosa first by legal, and then by illegal means, in order to strip the land of its natural resources. The story includes several flashbacks to the original series.

Partial cast
 Ben Johnson as Bronc Evans
 Michael Landon Jr. as "Benj" Cartwright
 Emily Warfield as Sara Cartwright
 Alistair MacDougall as Adam "A.C." Cartwright Jr.
 Brian Leckner as Josh Cartwright
 Richard Roundtree as Jacob Briscoe
 Jack Elam as Buckshot
 Dirk Blocker as Walter Fenster
 David Sage as Miller Swanson
 Stewart Moss as Preston McAdam
 Dean Stockwell as Augustus Brandenburg
 Linda Gray as Abigail "Laredo" Stimmons
 John Ingle as Judge Jefferson MacKenzie
 Archie Lang as Dr. Green
 Richard Fullerton as Head Surveyor
 Charles Gunning as Otis

Reception
Variety said, "Barring a big-screen version, it may be time to let the Cartwrights ride off into the sunset."

References

External links
 

1997 television films
1997 films
1990s English-language films
American Western (genre) television films
Bonanza
Films directed by Jerry Jameson
Films set in 1905
NBC network original films
NBC Productions films
Television sequel films
Television series reunion films
1993 films